The 2020 Texas Tech Red Raiders baseball team represented Texas Tech University during the 2020 NCAA Division I baseball season. The Red Raiders played their home games at Dan Law Field at Rip Griffin Park as a member of the Big 12 Conference. The team was led by 8th year head coach Tim Tadlock. On March 12, the team announced the series against West Virginia would be postponed due to the coronavirus pandemic. A few days later it was announced that the remainder of the team's season would be cancelled.

Previous season
The 2019 team finished the regular season with a 36–15 record (16–8 in conference play), finishing first in the Big 12. The Red Raiders finished the NCAA Tournament 5–1, with their only loss being in game 5 against conference rival . The team advanced to the College World Series, but lost 3–5 to Michigan in game 1. The Red Raiders defeated #5 Arkansas 5–4 in game 2 and defeated Florida State 4–1 in game 3. In game 4, Texas Tech was eliminated by Michigan in a lopsided 3–15 defeat. The team finished with an overall record of 46–20.

Personnel

Roster

Coaching staff

Schedule and results

"#" represents ranking. All rankings from D1Baseball on the date of the contest.
"()" represents postseason seeding in the Big 12 Tournament.

Notes

Rankings

2020 MLB draft

References

External links
2020 Team Roster

Texas Tech Red Raiders
Texas Tech Red Raiders baseball seasons
Texas Tech Baseball